Gerry Marks is a Canadian First Nations artist of Haida ancestry.

He grew up in Vancouver, British Columbia, the grandson of John Marks, a Haida artist.

Marks studied with the Haida carver Freda Diesing in Prince Rupert, British Columbia, starting in 1971 and later studied at Hazelton, British Columbia

In 1977 Marks and Francis Williams carved a 25-foot totem pole in Masset, his ancestral Haida village on the Queen Charlotte Islands.

References

Living people
20th-century First Nations sculptors
Artists from Vancouver
Haida woodcarvers
Year of birth missing (living people)